E. cinnamomea may refer to:
 Eublemma cinnamomea, a moth species found in the New World tropics, from the southern United States south to Argentina
 Euphaedra cinnamomea, a butterfly species found in the Democratic Republic of Congo

See also 
 Cinnamomea (disambiguation)